Garzê County or Ganzi County is one of the 18 subdivisions of the Garzê Tibetan Autonomous Prefecture, in northwestern Sichuan province, China. The Yalong River passes just south of the town Garzê, also known as Ganzi, the capital town of the county, which has some 16,920 inhabitants (2010), many of them ethnic Tibetans, and is famous for its Tibetan lamasery. Historically, it is part of the Tibetan cultural region of Kham and now defunct province of Xikang (or Sikang). It lies on the northern section of the Sichuan-Tibet Highway.

Geography and climate

Due to its elevation, Garzê County has a monsoon-influenced humid continental climate (Köppen Dwb) and subarctic climate, with cold but very dry winters, and warm summers with frequent rain. Over two-thirds of the annual precipitation of  occurs from June thru September. With monthly percent possible sunshine ranging from 49% in July to 74% in November and December, the county seat receives abundant, outside of summer, sunshine, totalling 2,620 hours annually. The diurnal temperature variation is large, averaging  annually.

Towns and townships 
 Garzê Town
 Nanduo Township
 Shengkang Township
 Gonglong Township
 Zheke Township
 Laima Township
 Xise Township
 Kagong Township
 Renguo Township
 Tuoba Township
 Si'e Township
 Tingka Township
 Xiaxiong Township
 Sitongda Township
 Duoduo Township
 Nike Township
 Chazha Township
 Dade Township
 Kalong Township
 Chalong Township

Transport 
China National Highway 317
Garze Gesar Airport

References

External links 

County-level divisions of Sichuan
Populated places in the Garzê Tibetan Autonomous Prefecture